Tayfun Eren (born 13 March 1959) is a former Australian politician. He was a Labor member for Doutta Galla in the Victorian Legislative Council from 1996 to 1999.

Career 

Eren was elected in a by-election caused by the retirement of David White. He was the first person of Turkish birth to be elected to a Parliament in Australia. In 1999, Eren was disendorsed by the ALP following his involvement in a domestic violence court case.

References

External links
Tayfun Eren at re-member

1959 births
Living people
Australian Labor Party members of the Parliament of Victoria
Members of the Victorian Legislative Council
Turkish emigrants to Australia